The list of Rice University people includes notable alumni, former students, faculty, and presidents of Rice University.

Alumni

The names of Distinguished Alumni Award recipients is available online (the list is arranged alphabetically and includes recipients of other Rice University awards)

Government and politics
Note: individuals who belong in multiple sections appear in the most relevant section.

U.S. Cabinet Secretaries
 Charles Duncan, 1947, U.S. Secretary of Energy (1979–1981)
 Alberto Gonzales, 1979, United States Attorney General (2005–2007)

U.S. Ambassadors
 James Ward Hargrove, 1943, Ambassador to Australia (1976–1977)
 Eric Nelson, 1983, Ambassador to Bosnia and Herzegovina (2019–present)

Other federal officials
 Patrick G. Carrick, member of the Senior Executive Service
 Robert L. Clarke, 1963, attorney, Comptroller of the Currency (1985–1992) 
 L. Patrick Gray (attended), acting director of the Federal Bureau of Investigation (1972–1973)
 Josh Earnest, 1997, White House Press Secretary for President Barack Obama (2014–2017)
 Stephen Hahn 1980, Commissioner of the Food and Drug Administration (2019–2021)
 Benjamin J. Rhodes, 2000, speechwriter and national security adviser to Barack Obama

U.S. Senators and Congressmen
 Bill Archer (attended), United States Congressman (1971–2001)
 Jim Bridenstine, 1998, U.S. Representative, Oklahoma's 1st congressional district (2013–2018); Administrator of NASA (2018–2021)
 John Kline, 1969, United States Congressman (2003–2017)
 Pete Olson, 1985, United States Congressman (2009–2021)
 Albert Thomas, 1920, U.S. Representative, Texas's 8th congressional district (1937–1966)

Governors
 Glenn Youngkin, 1990, Governor of Virginia (2022-present)
 James V. Allred (attended), Governor of Texas (1935–1939)

Mayors
 George Chang, Ph.D. 1966, mayor of Tainan, Taiwan (1997–2001)
 Roy Hofheinz, 1932 (attended), mayor of the City of Houston (1953–1955)
 Annise Parker, 1978, mayor of the City of Houston (2010–2016)
 Starke Taylor, 1943, mayor of the City of Dallas (1983–1987)

State and local officials
 George P. Bush, 1998, commissioner of the Texas General Land Office; son of Florida Governor Jeb Bush; nephew of former President George W. Bush; grandson of former President George H. W. Bush
 William P. Hobby Jr., 1953, Lieutenant Governor of Texas (1973–1991); former chancellor of the University of Houston System; former president and executive editor at The Houston Post
 Scott Hochberg, member of the Texas House of Representatives
 M. J. Khan, Master of Business Administration, former Houston City Council member
 Eliot Shapleigh, 1974, Texas state senator

Judges
 Lamar John Ryan Cecil, 1923, United States District Judge of the United States District Court for the Eastern District of Texas (1954-1958)
 Finis E. Cowan, 1951, United States District Judge of the United States District Court for the Southern District of Texas (1977-1979)
 Harold R. DeMoss Jr., 1952, Federal Judge on the United States Court of Appeals for the Fifth Circuit (1991-2015)
 Hugh Gibson, 1940, United States district judge of the United States District Court for the Southern District of Texas (1979-1998)
 Sam E. Haddon, 1959, United States district judge of the United States District Court for the District of Montana (2012–present)
 Sharon Keller, 1975, Presiding Judge of the Texas Court of Criminal Appeals (2001–present)
 James Aubrey Parker, 1959, Senior Judge of the United States District Court for the District of New Mexico (2003–present)
 Karen Gren Scholer, 1979, United States District Judge of the United States District Court for the Northern District of Texas (2018–present)
 Anuraag Singhal, 1986, United States District Judge of the United States District Court for the Southern District of Florida (2019–present)
 Leslie H. Southwick, 1972, Federal Judge on the 5th U.S. Circuit Court of Appeals

Other
 Mitch Bainwol, 1983, former chair, Republican National Committee
 William Luther Pierce, 1955, National Alliance founder, noted neo-Nazi, and author of the Turner Diaries
 Gary H. Stern, chief executive of the Ninth Federal Reserve Bank, at Minneapolis
Doc Thomson, god-tier

Arts and letters

Architecture
 E. Fay Jones, Master of Architecture degree 1951, architect, named in 2000 by the American Institute of Architects as "one of the ten most influential architects of the twentieth century"
 Eric Kuhne, 1973, British architect
 Charles Renfro, BArch 1989, architect, partner of Diller Scofidio + Renfro

Fashion
 James Mischka, 1985, designer and co-founder of Badgley Mischka

Film and television
 Elizabeth Avellán, 1992, film producer and co-founder of Troublemaker Studios
 Ron Bozman, 1969, Academy Award-winning film producer (The Silence of the Lambs)
 John William Corrington, M.A. 1960, screenwriter
 James Craig, actor (Kitty Foyle)
 Germaine Franco, 1984, film composer (Coco)
 Amy Hobby, 1986, Academy Award-nominated producer
 Howard Hughes (attended), filmmaker known for Hell's Angel's (1930) and Scarface (1932); life and career served as the basis for the 2004 film The Aviator
 Tim League, 1992, founder of Alamo Drafthouse Cinema, a high end theatre chain, and Drafthouse Films, film distributor
 Mike MacRae, 1999, voice actor, comedian
 Gus Sorola (attended), Machinima artist and founding member of Rooster Teeth.

History and journalism
 William Broyles Jr., 1966, founder of Texas Monthly; former editor in chief at Newsweek; screenwriter of Apollo 13, Cast Away, Unfaithful, Flags of Our Fathers
 Gwynne Dyer, M.A. 1966, journalist, syndicated columnist and military historian; Senior Lecturer in War Studies at the Royal Military Academy Sandhurst (1973–1977)
 John Graves, 1942, nature writer, Goodbye to a River
 Jo Ling Kent, 2006, NBC News correspondent
 Michael Noer, 1992, executive news editor for Forbes.com
 Steve Sailer, 1980, writer for Taki's Magazine and VDARE
 Rosa Levin Toubin, Jewish Texan historian, civic leader and philanthropist
 Lamar White, 2005, investigative journalist known for his work on racism and political corruption in the Deep South
Zack Kopplin, 2015, political activist, journalist, and television personality who came to fame during high school for publicly campaigning against the Louisiana Science Education Act, a creationism law. He currently serves as an investigator for the Government Accountability Project.

Literature
 Candace Bushnell (attended), author of Sex and the City
 Eva Hoffman, 1967, author, Lost in Translation, Shtetl: The Life and Death of a Small Town and the World of Polish Jews, The Secret: A Novel, After Such Knowledge
 Larry McMurtry, M.A. 1960, Pulitzer Prize-winning author, known for Lonesome Dove, The Last Picture Show, and Terms of Endearment; won Oscar for Brokeback Mountain screenplay
 Elizabeth Moon, 1968, author, The Deed of Paksenarrion, Winning Colors
 Joyce Carol Oates (attended), author; Princeton creative writing professor; dropped out of English PhD program after publishing in Best American Short Stories
 John Pipkin, PhD 1997, novelist

Music
 Lola Astanova, Master's 2005, summa cum laude, Russian-born classical pianist
 Rebecca Carrington, Masters in Music, British "music comedian"
 Carl P. Daw Jr., Episcopalian priest; director of the Hymn Society in the United States and Canada; researcher and authority on sacred music
 Caroline Shaw, 2004, Pulitzer Prize-winning musician
Kate Soper, 2003, Pulitzer Prize-finalist musician

Visual art
 Robert S. Martin, 1971, librarian; member of National Council for the Humanities; former director of Institute of Museum & Library Services; 2008 recipient of Presidential Citizens Medal
 Mark Flood, 1981, contemporary artist

Business
 Brian Armstrong, 2005 and 2006, founder and CEO of Coinbase
 George R. Brown, 1920, founder of Brown and Root, one of the world's largest construction firms
 Thomas H. Cruikshank, former chairman and CEO of Halliburton
 L. John Doerr, 1973, venture capitalist at Kleiner, Perkins, Caufield & Byers; CEO of Silicon Compilers; co-founder of the @Home Network; on the board of directors of Intuit, Amazon.com, PalmOne, Sun Microsystems, Google, and Segway
 Charles Duncan, 1947, former president, Coca-Cola; former Secretary of Energy under Jimmy Carter (1979–1981)
 Mark Dankberg, 1976, co-founder and CEO, ViaSat
 Mark Durcan, 1984, CEO of Micron Technology
 Lynn Elsenhans, chairman and CEO of Sunoco
 Kevin Harvey, 1987, founding member and general partner at Benchmark, a Silicon Valley venture capital firm.
 Howard Hughes (attended), richest man in the world in 1976
 Steve Jackson, 1974, founder of Steve Jackson Games
 Ken Kennedy, 1967, founder of Center for Research on Parallel Computation, the High Performance Fortran Forum; co-chair of the President's Information Technology Advisory Committee with Bill Joy of Sun Microsystems
 Ali Yıldırım Koç, 1990, Koç Holding member; 37th president of Turkish multisport club Fenerbahçe S.K.
 Fred C. Koch (attended), founder of Koch Industries, one of the largest private companies in the United States
 James E. Lyon, Houston developer and Republican politician
 Cal McNair, 1995, chairman and CEO of the Houston Texans NFL franchise
 Arun Netravali, 1969 and 1971, pioneer of digital technology including HDTV; former president of Bell Laboratories and Chief Scientist for Lucent Technologies
 David Rhodes, 1996, president of CBS News; former head of U.S. television for Bloomberg.
 Hector Ruiz, 1972, president and CEO of AMD
 James Treybig, 1963 and 1964, founder of Tandem Computers
 Jim Turley, 1977 and 1978, chairman and CEO of Ernst & Young
 Jim Whitehurst, 1989, president and CEO of Red Hat
 Glenn Youngkin, 1990, former co-CEO of The Carlyle Group

Science and technology

Astronauts
 John S. Bull, 1957, BS in mechanical engineering, NASA astronaut
 Takao Doi, PhD 2004, NASA astronaut
 Jeffrey A. Hoffman, Masters in materials science, 1988, NASA astronaut
 Nichole Ayers, 2021, NASA astronaut candidate for NASA Astronaut Group 23. 
 Tamara E. Jernigan, PhD 1988, NASA astronaut
 James H. Newman, 1982 and 1984, NASA astronaut
 John D. Olivas, PhD 1996, NASA astronaut
 Janice Voss, graduate work in Space Physics 1977–1978, NASA astronaut
 Shannon Walker, Baker 1987, MA 1992, PhD 1993, NASA astronaut
 Peggy Whitson, PhD 1986 NASA astronaut

NASA flight directors
 Kwatsi Alibaruho MBA 2011, first African-American flight director in NASA history and the lead flight director for the last space shuttle mission
 Wayne Hale, Hanszen 1976, mechanical engineering, Space Shuttle Flight Director for 40 missions between 1988 and 2003

Nobel laureates
 Robert Woodrow Wilson, 1957, co-discoverer of cosmic microwave background radiation
 Robert F. Curl Jr., 1954, co-discoverer of fullerenes

Other sciences
 Jay Bailey, BA 1966, PhD 1969, pioneer of biochemical engineering
 Andrew Dessler, Lovett 1986 climate change meteorologist
 Mark Durcan, 1979–1984, Master of Chemical Engineering and a BS chemical engineering, chief executive officer at Micron Technology
 David Eagleman, 1993, neuroscientist at Stanford University and author of Sum: Forty Tales from the Afterlives
 James E. Gunn, Baker 1961, astronomer at Princeton University,  1977 National Academy of Sciences  2009 recipient of the National Medal of Science
 Wanda Gass, 1978, electrical engineer who helped develop the first commercially viable digital signal processor at Texas Instruments
 He Jiankui, PhD 2010, widely condemned geneticist who claimed to have created the world's first genome edited babies, Nana and Lulu
 Dave Hyatt, Baker 1994, browser developer at Netscape and Apple
 Howard Johnson, PhD 1982, electrical engineer
 Riki Kobayashi, 1943, B.S., chemical engineering.
 Larry Lake, PhD 1973, petroleum engineer and member of the National Academy of Engineering
 Amy Leventer, 1988, Ph.D., geology, marine biologist, micropaleontologist, Antarctic researcher
 Frank L. Lewis, 1971, MEE.
 George Whitelaw Mackey, 1938, mathematician, 1962 National Academy of Sciences
 Diana McSherry, 1967, M.A., 1969, Ph.D., computer scientist, biophysicist
 Jack Morava, 1968, mathematician
 John Morgan, 1968, mathematician, 2013 National Academy of Sciences
 Harold E. Rorschach Jr., professor of physics at Rice (1952-1993), was the chairman of the physics department three times and principal investigator of the NASA interdisciplinary laboratory at Rice
 Steven Schafersman, 1983 PhD in geology, president of Texas Citizens for Science
 Dorry Segev, Israeli-born Marjory K. and Thomas Pozefsky Professor of Surgery at Johns Hopkins University School of Medicine, Professor of Epidemiology at Johns Hopkins Bloomberg School of Public Health, and Associate Vice Chair of the Department of Surgery at Johns Hopkins Hospital
 Fred I. Stalkup, 1957 BS in chemical engineering, 1961 Ph.D. chemical engineering noted for work in enhanced oil recovery, member of the National Academy of Engineering 
 Dennis Sullivan, 1963 BA in mathematics, mathematician at Stony Brook University and CUNY grad school; recipient of the 2004 National Medal of Science; 2010 Wolf Prize in Mathematics; 2022 Abel Prize
Powtawche Valerino, PhD 2005, mechanical engineer at the NASA Jet Propulsion Laboratory who worked on the Cassini mission

Academia
 Daniel Albright, 1967, Harvard University English professor
 Walter L. Buenger, Ph.D. 1979, historian at Texas A&M University
 Nancy Cole, 1964, educational psychologist
 Gwynne Dyer, 1973–1977, Senior Lecturer in War Studies at the Royal Military Academy Sandhurst
 Cristle Collins Judd B.M./M.M. 1983, 11th President of Sarah Lawrence College
 R. Bowen Loftin, Ph.D. 1975, chancellor of the University of Missouri
 Bennett McCallum, B.A. 1957, B.S. 1958, Ph.D. 1969, monetary economist and professor at the Tepper School of Business
 Robert K. Ritner, 1975, Egyptologist at the University of Chicago
 Roland W. Schmitt, Ph.D. 1951, President of Rensselaer Polytechnic Institute (1988–1993)
 Namita Gupta Wiggers, 1989, expert in the field of contemporary craft, curator, educator and writer
 Kannan Moudgalya, PhD 1985, professor of Chemical Engineering at IITB
 Shriram Krishnamurthi, PhD 2000, professor of computer science at Brown University and developer of the Racket programming language
Nikta Fakhri, PhD 2011, Professor of Physics at Massachusetts Institute of Technology

Religion
 The Rt. Rev. Scott Field Bailey, 1938, bishop of the Episcopal Diocese of West Texas
 The Rev. Carl P. Daw Jr., Will Rice 1966, executive director of the Hymn Society in the United States and Canada
 The Rt. Rev. Claude Edward Payne, 1954, 1955, bishop of the Episcopal Diocese of Texas
 The Rt. Rev. Steven Tighe, 1978, bishop of the Anglican Diocese of the Southwest

Sports

Baseball
 David Aardsma, 2003, MLB pitcher, 22nd overall pick of the San Francisco Giants
 Lance Berkman, 1997, six-time All-Star Major League baseball player for the Houston Astros
 Norm Charlton, 1984, Major League Baseball player
 Bubba Crosby, 1998, Major League Baseball player for the New York Yankees
 José Cruz Jr., 1993, Major League Baseball player
 Tyler Duffey, Major League Baseball player for the Minnesota Twins
 Brock Holt, 2009, Major League Baseball utility player for the Boston Red Sox
 Philip Humber, 2004, Major League Baseball player, 3rd overall pick of the New York Mets; pitched a perfect game in 2012
 Jeff Niemann, 2004, Major League Baseball pitcher, 4th overall pick of the Tampa Bay Devil Rays
 Anthony Rendon, 2011, Major League Baseball first-round draft choice of the Washington Nationals

Basketball
 Morris Almond, 2007, NBA guard, 25th overall pick of the Utah Jazz
Suleiman Braimoh (born 1989), Nigerian-American basketball player in the Israel Basketball Premier League
Egor Koulechov (born 1994), Israeli-Russian professional basketball player for Israeli team Ironi Nahariya
 Ricky Pierce, 1983, NBA guard, 1983–1998; NBA All-Star 1991; NBA Sixth Man of the Year Award 1987 and 1990
 Mike Wilks, 2001, NBA guard 2002–09

Football
 Tony Barker, 1992, former NFL player for the Washington Redskins
 O.J. Brigance, 1991, former NFL player
 Chris Boswell, NFL placekicker, Pittsburgh Steelers
 James Casey, NFL tight end/fullback for the Houston Texans
 Patrick Dendy, NFL player, Green Bay Packers
 Buddy Dial, end, College Football Hall of Fame inductee 1993, All-Pro 1961, 1963
 Jarett Dillard, 2008, Jacksonville Jaguars wide receiver
 Michael Downs 1981, NFL All-Pro safety, Dallas Cowboys
 Emmanuel Ellerbee, 2018, NFL linebacker for the Atlanta Falcons
 Jack Fox (American football), 2019, NFL Punter for the Detroit Lions
 Courtney Hall, 1989, NFL offensive lineman, 1989 2nd round draft pick of the San Diego Chargers
 King Hill, quarterback, top pick in first round of 1958 NFL Draft
 Billy Howton, NFL's former all-time receiving leader, Green Bay Packers and Dallas Cowboys
 Weldon Humble, guard, College Football Hall of Fame Inductee, 1961
 Larry Izzo, 3 time Pro Bowl LB/special teams captain for the New England Patriots, Super Bowl Champions 2002, 2004, 2005
 N.D. Kalu, NFL defensive end for the Houston Texans
 Tommy Kramer, NFL quarterback, named to Pro Bowl while playing for the Minnesota Vikings
 Dicky Moegle, 1954, halfback, inducted into Cotton Bowl Classic Hall of Fame in 1998; College Football Hall of Fame Inductee, 1979
 Don Maynard, wide receiver, Pro Football Hall of Fame inductee
 Will McClay, coach of the Dallas Desperados, an Arena Football League team
 Vance McDonald, 2013, NFL tight end
 Cheta Ozougwu, defensive end for Chicago Bears, 2011 Mr. Irrelevant
 Tobin Rote, quarterback of 1957 NFL Champion Detroit Lions and 1963 AFL Champion San Diego Chargers
 Frank Beall Ryan, 1958, PhD 1965, NFL quarterback; textbook author; Yale athletic director; appeared on cover of Sports Illustrated, January 4, 1965
 James Williams, end and kicker
 Luke Willson, 2013, NFL tight end

Tennis

 Sam Match (1923–2010), tennis player; won the NCAA doubles championship with Rice University in 1947
 Harold Solomon (born 1952), professional tennis player ranked as high as number 5 in the world

Track and field

 Andrea Blackett 1997, Barbados Olympic hurdler and 1998 Commonwealth Games 400 m hurdles champion
 Jason Colwick, 2010, two-time NCAA champion in pole vault
 Fred Hansen, 1963, NCAA champion in pole vault, gold medalist at 1964 Summer Olympics, world record holder
 Dave Roberts, 1974, bronze medalist in pole vault at 1976 Summer Olympics, and former world record holder (twice) in pole vault
 Sean Wade, Master runner of the Year and Coach of the Cross Country team at The Kinkaid School

Other
 Adi Bichman, 2001, Israeli freestyle and medley swimmer
Sam McGuffie, 2013, member of the 2018 U.S. Olympic Men's Bobsleigh Team as a push crewman for the four man bobsled and brakeman for the two-man bobsled
 Robert L. Leuschner Jr., 1957, graduated as a chemical engineer, but after joining the NROTC at Rice, pursued a distinguished career in the U.S. Navy, attaining the rank of rear admiral

Miscellaneous
 Bill Arhos, KLRU station manager, program director; Austin City Limits executive producer
 John Bradshaw, author and motivational speaker
 Amanda Goad, Scripps National Spelling Bee champion
 Henry Masterson III, National Medal of Arts recipient
 Mark William Calaway, Professional Wrestler, inducted into the WWE Hall of Fame in 2022

Faculty and staff

Nobel laureates
 Robert F. Curl Jr. (also an alumnus of Rice), professor of chemistry, awarded 1996 in chemistry for the discovery of fullerenes
 Hermann Joseph Muller, professor of biology, awarded 1946 in physiology or medicine for the discovery for X-ray mutagenesis
 Richard Smalley, professor of chemistry, awarded 1996 in chemistry for the discovery of fullerenes
 Robert Woodrow Wilson, senior scientist, Harvard-Smithsonian Center for Astrophysics; awarded 1978 in physics for the discovery of cosmic microwave background radiation
 Roger Penrose, former Rice University’s Edgar Odell Lovett Professor of Mathematics, awarded 2020 in physics for the discovery that black hole formation is a robust prediction of the general theory of relativity

Other faculty
 Hanan Ashrawi, Palestinian scholar and activist
 Richard Baraniuk, professor of Electrical and Computer Engineering
 Tani E. Barlow, feminist scholar
 Earl Black, political science professor
 Elias Bongmba, professor of Religious Studies
 Douglas Brinkley, award-winning historian
 Solomon Bochner, mathematician
 Bun B (guest lecturer), rapper
 C. Sidney Burrus, electrical engineer
 B. Jill Carroll, professor of Religious Studies
 Suchan Chae, Korean politician and economics professor
 Franklin Chang-Diaz, former NASA astronaut
 Justin Cronin, author and professor of English
 Rajdeep Dasgupta, professor of Planetary Studies
 Gerald R. Dickens, professor of Earth Science
 Edward Djerejian, American diplomat
 Jack Dongarra, 2021 Turing Award Winner and Adjunct Professor of Computer Science
 Elaine Howard Ecklund, professor of Sociology
 Paul Ellison, bass musician
 Mark Embree, mathematician
 Matthias Felleisen, former professor of computer science who co-invented A-normal form and led the development of the Racket programming language
 Ariel Fernandez, physical chemist
 Naomi Halas, professor of biochemical engineering, chemistry and physics
 Mauro Hamza, fencing coach
 Julian Huxley, evolutionary biologist
 Ken Kennedy, computer scientist
 Anne C. Klein, professor of Religious Studies and Buddhist scholar
 Riki Kobayashi, chemical engineer
 Jeffrey Kurtzman, pianist and musicologist
 Sydney Lamb, linguist
 Neal Lane, physicist and former director of the National Science Foundation
 Robert Lewis, actor, director and co-founder of the Actors Studio
 Qilin Li, environmental engineer
 Cho-Liang Lin, American violinist and soloist
 D. Michael Lindsay, sociologist
 Andreas Luttge, professor of Earth Science and Chemistry
 George Marcus, anthropologist
 Guy T. McBride, chemical engineer
 Brian O'Brien, space scientist
 Ann Saterbak, professor of Biomedical engineering
 Scott Sonenshein, organizational psychologist
 Monroe K. Spears (1916-1998), Libbie Shearn Moody Professor of English at Rice University from 1964 to 1986.
 Robert M. Stein, political scientist
 Robert B. Stobaugh, economics writer
 Yizhi Jane Tao, biochemist
 Richard Tapia, mathematician and winner of the National Medal of Science
 James Tour, chemist and nanotechnologist
 Frank Vandiver, American Civil War historian and university president
 Moshe Vardi, Israeli mathematician and computer scientist
 William F. Walker, engineer and university president
 Martin Wiener, historian
 Peter Wolynes, professor of Chemistry
 Susan Wood, poet and professor of English
 Stephen A. Zeff, accounting historian
 Mikki Hebl, professor of psychology and management

Staff

 John Heisman, for whom the coveted Heisman Trophy is named; football coach, 1924–1927, College Football Hall of Fame inductee, 1954
 Jess Neely, football coach 1940–1966, College Football Hall of Fame inductee, 1971

Presidents of Rice
Edgar Odell Lovett (president founding to 1946)
William V. Houston (president 1946–1961)
Kenneth Pitzer (president 1961–1968)
Norman Hackerman (president 1970–1985)
George Rupp (president 1985–1993)
Malcolm Gillis (president 1993–2004)
David Leebron (president 2004 to 2022)
Reginald DesRoches (president 2022 to present)

References

Rice University people
Rice University people